Sky Commando is a 1953 American war film released by Columbia Pictures, directed by Fred F. Sears and starring Dan Duryea, Frances Gifford and Mike Connors (credited as "Touch Conners").  The Cold War period provides the background, although the plot concerns a flashback to World War II aerial action.

Sky Commando was the last major film feature for Frances Gifford as her postwar career was affected by serious personal problems. The film was one of Connors' first, having made his debut in Sudden Fear (1952); he had previously appeared in Sears' The 49th Man, earlier in 1953.

Plot
During the Korean War, while American Air Force pilots Lt. John Willard (William Bryant) and his brother Frank (Dick Paxton) are flying a routine reconnaissance mission, their commanding officer, Col. Ed Wyatt (Dan Duryea) orders them to bomb an enemy position. Frank's aircraft is shot down, and John returns to  confront his commander over the reason for the dangerous mission. Wyatt's executive officer, Maj. Scott (Michael Fox) stops him and relates a story about Wyatt's career during World War II.

In the 8th Air Force, Wyatt commanded a bomber group whose reconnaissance missions provided valuable information for future bombing raids. War correspondent Jo McWethy (Frances Gifford) who was assigned to cover Wyatt's group, wanted to know the truth about his reputation for being a hard-driving and unsympathetic commanding officer. His pilots held Wyatt responsible for the death of his co-pilot during a dangerous mission and new co-pilot, Lt. Hobson "Hobbie" Lee (Mike Connors), becomes the replacement. During a "milk-run", Wyatt changed the mission to photograph heavily defended Bremen. German anti-aircraft batteries shot down several fighter escorts and badly damaged Wyatt's aircraft, killing three of his crew. Nursing the stricken bomber back home, Wyatt made the decision to dump everything to save the aircraft and its important film. Hobbie and waist-gunner Danny Nelson (Freeman Morse) had to ditch the bodies of the dead crew and parachute out. Wyatt then flew back with the injured navigator aboard.

During his recuperation, Hobbie met Jo who was also unsure about Wyatt's decisions and when Hobbie followed Wyatt to North Africa, he was seeking confirmation that his commander was a ruthless martinet. During a dangerous mission over Romanian oil fields, Wyatt's bomber was shot down. Although five of the crew were saved, gunner Danny Nelson was killed. With the aid of partisans, Hobbie reconciled with the badly wounded Wyatt, and managed to convey the crucial roll of film safely back to England.

When Scott concludes his story, Lt. Willard realizes that Wyatt does care for his men. A wire the next day informs him that his brother is still alive and has been rescued.

Cast
As credited, with screen roles identified:

 Dan Duryea as Colonel Ed (E.D.) Wyatt
 Frances Gifford as Jo McWethy  
 Mike Connors as Lieutenant Hobson "Hobbie" Lee (credited as "Touch Conners")
 Michael Fox as Major Scott
 William Bryant as Lieutenant John "Johnny" Willand (listed as Will R. Klein) 
 Freeman Morse as Danny Nelson
 Dick Paxton as Captain Frank Willard
 Selmer Jackson as General Carson
 Dick Lerner as "Jorgy"
 Morris Ankrum as General W.R. Combs

Production
Sky Commando was a typical Fred F. Sears actioner, combining an array of stock footage with live action. As one of the many features that Sears helmed in a very short period, the film was a "B" feature, although it did star Duryea, Gifford and future TV star Mike Connors. With principal photography done over an eight-day span, March 16–23, 1953, most of the production work that remained involved merging the stock combat footage of USAF and USAAF action. The preponderance of stock footage was not always carefully integrated; Consolidated B-24 Liberator, Boeing B-17 Flying Fortress, North American B-25 Mitchell, North American F-86 Sabre and Lockheed F-80 Shooting Star footage was, at times, jarringly spliced together, with a view of a bomber changing dramatically to a different aircraft. Most of the action in the cockpit between Conners and Duryea was filmed in a B-25 bomber cockpit.

In an interview with Tom Weaver, Mike Connors recalled they were told that the last two days shooting of their six day filming schedule was technically unsuitable. Connors and Duryea assumed they would make money with two more days shooting, but producer Sam Katzman informed the pair that he made their re shooting the film unnecessary by using more aircraft stock footage.<ref>p. 29 Weaver, Tom Mike Connors Interview in Eye on Science Fiction: 20 Interviews with Classic SF and Horror Filmmakers ‎ McFarland; New Ed edition (9 April 2007)</ref>

Reception
Like most of Fred F. Sears' work, with its poor production values and stagey plot, Sky Commando  was not well received. Reviewer Hal Erickson, in a latter day critique, observed that the film was notable for presenting Duryea in a sympathetic role, and for the presence of former headliner Frances Gifford.

References
Notes

Citations

Bibliography
 
 Carlson, Mark. Flying on Film: A Century of Aviation in the Movies, 1912–2012. Duncan, Oklahoma: BearManor Media, 2012. .
 Orriss, Bruce. When Hollywood Ruled the Skies: The Aviation Film Classics of World War II. Hawthorne, California: Aero Associates Inc., 1984. .
 Wheeler, Winston Dixon. Lost in the Fifties: Recovering Phantom Hollywood.'' Carbondale, Illinois: Southern Illinois University Press, 2005.

External links
 
 
 

1953 films
American war films
American aviation films
Films about shot-down aviators
American World War II films
1950s English-language films
Columbia Pictures films
Cold War films
Korean War aviation films
Films directed by Fred F. Sears
Films about the United States Air Force
1953 war films
American black-and-white films
1950s American films